E.J. Khaile was the Secretary-General of the African National Congress from 1927 to 1930. Before this, in the mid-1920s,
Khaile was involved with the Cape Town branch of the Communist Party of South Africa.

References 

Members of the African National Congress
Year of birth missing
Year of death missing
African National Congress politicians
South African Communist Party politicians